The Auditorium (formerly the RLDS Auditorium) is a house of worship and office building located on the greater Temple Lot in Independence, Missouri.  The Auditorium is part of the headquarters complex of Community of Christ which also includes the Independence Temple.

Construction
Construction of the Auditorium was a major undertaking, illustrating the vision of church Prophet/President Frederick M. Smith who provided the building's inspiration.  Ground was broken in 1926 and the building was finally completed in 1958. Smith's plans for the Conference chamber were originally about 66% larger than when it was finished. Construction was virtually halted during the Great Depression when the church struggled under a massive debt.

Auditorium pipe organ
The Auditorium houses an Aeolian-Skinner pipe organ with 113 ranks and 6,334 pipes. The Auditorium Organ includes an antiphonal console and pipes in the rear balcony of the oval chamber.  It is listed as one of the 75 largest pipe organs in the world. Famed organist John Obetz (1933–2015) originated his Auditorium Organ weekly radio program from the Auditorium between 1968–1993, playing the Aeolian-Skinner organ for a national audience.

Children's Peace Pavilion
The Children's Peace Pavilion, located in the Auditorium, was established in 1995 to pursue its mission of "Enriching the lives of children through the pursuit of peace for all."  It attracts visitors each year to a number of exhibits designed to teach concepts of personal peace, social peace, international peace, and environmental peace to children ages 5 through 11.  It is a frequent destination for elementary school field trips in the greater Kansas City area. Local Girl Scouts may earn Girl Scouts of the USA insignia through a partnership with Children's Peace Pavilion.  As a 501(c)3 charitable organization, Children's Peace Pavilion is governed by an independent board of directors.

Events

World Conferences
World Conferences of the church are held every three years in the World Conference chamber, which seats 5,800 people. The original plan for the Auditorium included two balconies, but due to limited finances only one was built.

Performances
The Auditorium hosts an annual performance and broadcast of Handel's Messiah by the Kansas City Symphony and the Independence Messiah Choir. The Community of Christ International Peace Award has been awarded in ceremonies at the Auditorium.

Other Events
In addition to religious use, the Auditorium is available for high school and college graduations and cultural events in the Independence and Kansas City area.  Numerous dignitaries have spoken in the Auditorium.  On June 27, 1945, Independence native Harry S. Truman gave a speech at the Auditorium on his first return trip to Independence during his presidency. During his remarks, which were also attended by First Lady Bess Truman and their daughter Margaret Truman, President Truman announced that the United States had become a signatory to the United Nations treaty. Former Secretary of State Colin Powell delivered an address at the Auditorium on July 24, 1998, commemorating the 50th anniversary of the executive order that led to the desegregation of the United States military. Primate researcher and environmentalist Jane Goodall spoke at the Auditorium in 1999.  On July 5, 2007, former United States President Bill Clinton gave the keynote address at the Auditorium commemorating the 50th anniversary of the Truman Presidential Library.

References

Further reading
Roger Yarrington, The Auditorium:  World Headquarters Building of the Reorganized Church of Jesus Christ of Latter Day Saints, Herald House, 1962.

External links

Auditorium pipe organ
Official website of the Children's Peace Pavilion
Community of Christ, official website

Peace museums in the United States
Museums in Jackson County, Missouri
Children's museums in Missouri
Latter Day Saint movement in Missouri
Museums established in 1995
Religious buildings and structures of the Community of Christ
Religious buildings and structures in Missouri
Significant places in Mormonism
Temple Lot
20th-century Latter Day Saint church buildings
Religious buildings and structures completed in 1958